Oliver Issa Schmitt (born 4 June 2000) is a German professional footballer who plays as a midfielder for Hessen Kassel.

Career
Born in Cologne, Schmitt played youth football for  before joining 1. FC Köln in 2007. He made his senior debut for 1. FC Köln II in a 1–0 win over Fortuna Köln on 27 July 2019. In June 2021, he signed a new three-year contract with the club and joined 3. Liga side SC Verl on a two-year loan deal. On 28 January 2022, the loan was terminated early.

References

External links

2000 births
Living people
German footballers
Footballers from Cologne
Association football midfielders
1. FC Köln players
1. FC Köln II players
SC Verl players
KSV Hessen Kassel players
3. Liga players
Regionalliga players